The Cleveland Charge are an American professional basketball team in the NBA G League based in Cleveland, Ohio, and are affiliated with the Cleveland Cavaliers. The team plays its home games at the Wolstein Center in downtown Cleveland.

The franchise was founded in 2001 as the Huntsville Flight, based in Huntsville, Alabama, before moving to Albuquerque, New Mexico in 2005, where they were known as the Albuquerque Thunderbirds until 2010. After playing the 2010–11 season in suburban Rio Rancho as the New Mexico Thunderbirds, the franchise was purchased by the Cavaliers and relocated to Canton, Ohio, where they played as the Canton Charge through the 2020–21 season.

The team won the 2006 NBA D-League championship while playing in Albuquerque. The team lost the 2003–04 NBA D-League Finals, and reached the semifinals in 2004–05, 2006–07, 2011–12, 2014–15 and 2015–16.

History
The team was formed in 2001 as the Huntsville Flight based in Huntsville, Alabama, as a founding member of the NBA Development League, the affiliate minor league of the National Basketball Association (NBA). They played home games at the Von Braun Center. In their first two seasons, they failed to make the playoffs, but in their third they reached the NBA D-League Finals, losing to the Asheville Altitude. The team ended its tenure in Alabama at the conclusion of the 2004–05 season after finishing third in the league and making the playoffs. The Flight were not affiliated with an NBA team.

Albuquerque
The team moved to Albuquerque, New Mexico, and became the Albuquerque Thunderbirds beginning in the 2005–06 season. They played home games at Tingley Coliseum. In their first season in New Mexico, the team won the 2006 NBA D-League Championship by defeating the Fort Worth Flyers in the championship game. In the 2006–07 season, they again made the playoffs, but were defeated by the Colorado 14ers. The Thunderbirds moved in 2010 to the Santa Ana Star Center in suburban Rio Rancho and were re-branded as the New Mexico Thunderbirds. They played just one season in Rio Rancho, finishing ninth and failing to make the playoffs for the fourth consecutive season. The Thunderbirds were affiliates of the Cleveland Cavaliers, Dallas Mavericks, Indiana Pacers, Miami Heat, New Orleans Hornets, Orlando Magic, Philadelphia 76ers, Phoenix Suns, Sacramento Kings, Seattle SuperSonics and Utah Jazz.

Canton

It was announced on July 7, 2011 the Thunderbirds had been purchased by the Cleveland Cavaliers and were moving to Canton, Ohio, for the 2011–12 season. Alex Jensen was named the first head coach of the Charge on October 11. On October 13, the Canton Charge name, logo, colors, and court design were unveiled. On October 20, the team announced the first two players of the new team: Keith McLeod and Jamine Peterson. On October 25, the new uniforms were released. In the 2011 NBA D-League Draft, the Canton Charge selected Tyrell Biggs in the first round. In their first game as the Canton Charge, they were defeated by the 2010-11 champions Iowa Energy in an 82–100 game at home. Their first win came against the Texas Legends in their third game, which they won by 108–87.

Steve Hetzel was named head coach on September 11, 2013, for 2013–14.

Cleveland
The team's 10-year lease with the Canton Memorial Civic Center expired following the single-site and abbreviated 2020–21 season where the Charge had played in Orlando, Florida, within the G League bubble due to COVID-19 pandemic restrictions. The Cavaliers chose not to renew the lease in Canton and instead relocated the team to downtown Cleveland to play at Cleveland State University's Wolstein Center beginning with the 2021–22 season. The team was officially announced as the Cleveland Charge on July 26, 2021, with the team's logos and branding being largely unchanged other than the switch from Canton to Cleveland in the logo. In September 2021, Charge head coach Nate Reinking became an assistant with the Cavaliers and Cavs' assistant Dan Geriot took over as Charge head coach.

In September 2022, it was announced that Cavaliers assistant Mike Gerrity would take over as head coach of the Charge, trading places with Geriot.

Logos and uniforms

Huntsville Flight
The first logo of the team, when it still was the Huntsville Flight, consisted of a yellow basketball with a red fighter aircraft flying around the ball, and below it was written "Huntsville" in blue and "Flight" in yellow. Their colors were red, yellow, navy and white. The home uniform was white with "Huntsville" and the numbers written in red, near the arm and in the neck there were black and navy little lines. Their away uniform was similar, but it was red instead of white and the numbers in yellow.

Albuquerque/New Mexico Thunderbirds
Their logo as Albuquerque and New Mexico was the same, with just one difference, the name written below the logo. The logo consisted on a bird black head, with a basketball in its claw. Their colors were dark yellow, black, white and orange. As New Mexico, they removed the orange color and replaced with grey. Their home uniform was white, with "Thunderbirds" and the numbers written in orange, and black details on the side of the jersey. The away uniform was orange, with black details, and letters ("Albuquerque") in white. As New Mexico, it had a little change; the away uniform used "T-Birds" instead of "New Mexico".

Canton Charge

Under the Cleveland Cavaliers ownership, the Charge adopted a similar style. The logo consists of a musketeer style soldier, with his sword pointing forward, and below him there is written "Canton Charge" in gold and white. The musketeer hat is wine and his clothes are gold. Their colors are wine, gold and white. They have an alternate logo, similar to the "C Sword Logo" from the Cavaliers, with a sword crossing a "C". Their original home uniform was gold with details, "Charge" and the numbers written in wine. The original away uniform was the same, only with the colors swapped.  When Nike took over supplying uniforms for the NBA G League for the 2017–18 season, the Charge adopted a white uniform with wine letters and gold number accents while tweaking their wine uniform set to feature navy numbers with gold accents and lettering.

Home arenas
 Von Braun Center (2001–2005)
 Tingley Coliseum (2005–2010)
 Santa Ana Star Center (2010–2011)
 Canton Memorial Civic Center (2011–2020) 
 Wolstein Center (2021–present)

Season-by-season

Current roster

Head coaches

NBA affiliates
During the franchise's time in Huntsville, from 2001 to 2005, it did not have an official affiliation with any NBA team. Since 2005, the Charge franchise has been affiliated with 11 NBA teams for various amounts of time. Until the purchase by the Cleveland Cavaliers in 2011, the Charge franchise had affiliations with at least two NBA teams per season, with as many as four affiliations during the 2005–06 season. 

Sacramento Kings (2005–2006)
Seattle SuperSonics (2005–2006)
Utah Jazz (2005–2006)
Phoenix Suns (2005–2008)
Cleveland Cavaliers (2006–2007)
Indiana Pacers (2006–2007)
Philadelphia 76ers (2007–2008)
Miami Heat (2008–2009)
Dallas Mavericks (2008–2010)
New Orleans Hornets (2009–2011)
Orlando Magic (2010–2011)
Cleveland Cavaliers (2011–present)

Media
Charge games are heard online via the iHeart owned NEO Sports Radio.

References

External links
Charge homepage
Official NBA G League website

Cleveland Charge

Basketball teams established in 2011
Sports in Canton, Ohio
Rock Ventures
2011 establishments in Ohio
Basketball teams in Ohio